Emma Amalia Ekwall (18 January 1838 – 1 February 1925) was a Swedish painter.

Life and career
Born in Gransbo, Småland, she was the daughter of the official Nils Fredrik Ekvall and Emelie Bernhardina Carolina Djurström and the sister of Knut, Gustaf, and Hugo Ekwall.

Ekwall studied at the Royal Swedish Academy of Fine Arts, Stockholm between 1865 and 1871. The latter year also saw her become the first woman to receive a royal medal. After her studies, she went abroad, spending time in Munich and Leipzig. She most notably painted portraits, as well as flowers and children, some of which are on display at Nationalmuseum.

In 1925, Ekwall died in Stockholm, at the age of 87.

Gallery

References

External links

 Emma Ekwall at Bukowskis.com  (archived copy)

1838 births
1925 deaths
19th-century Swedish painters
20th-century Swedish painters
Swedish portrait painters
Swedish still life painters
Swedish women painters
20th-century Swedish women artists
19th-century Swedish women artists